ISIRI 13139 is a standard published by the Institute of Standards and Industrial Research of Iran (ISIRI) in 2011 based on Directive 2009/61/EC. It defines "Installation of lighting and light-signalling devices on wheeled agricultural and forestry tractors".

Related sources
Other related sources are as follows:
 Directive 2003/37/EC of 26 May 2003 on type approval of agricultural or forestry tractors, their trailers and interchangeable towed machinery, together with their systems, components and separate technical units and repealing Directive 74/150/EEC.
 ISO R 1724: 1970- Electrical connections for vehicles with 6 or 12 volt electrical systems applying more specifically to private motor cars and lightweight trailers or caravans.
 ISO R 1185: 1970- Electrical connections between towing and towed vehicles having 24 volt electrical systems used for international commercial transport purposes.

See also
 Iran Tractor Manufacturing Company
 Iran Engineering Inspection

References

Automotive standards
Economy of Iran
13139